De Oro Puro (English title:Of Pure Gold) is a Venezuelan telenovela written by Julio César Mármol and produced by Radio Caracas Televisión in 1994. The telenovela lasted for 113 episodes. Hylene Rodríguez and Mauricio Rentería starred as the main protagonists.

Cast
Hylene Rodriguez as Mariana Brekenheimer
Mauricio Renteria as Marum Soulez Gruber
Jose Daniel Bort as Milton Soulez Gruber
Dad Dager as Rovenna
Dora Mazzone as Virginia Cusiel
Alexander Milic as Ianco Klopenberger
Flor Nuñez as Auriselvia Luzardo
Jorge Palacios as Erasmo Soulez Delfin
Francis Romero as Cecilia Azocar
Vicente Tepedino as Alcides Alfieri
Mariam Valero as Winnifer Lozano

References

External links
De Oro Puro at the Internet Movie Database
Promo:De oro puro

1993 telenovelas
RCTV telenovelas
Venezuelan telenovelas
1993 Venezuelan television series debuts
1994 Venezuelan television series endings
Spanish-language telenovelas
Television shows set in Venezuela